The 1968 Olympic football tournament was played as part of the 1968 Summer Olympics. The tournament features 16 men's national teams from five continental confederations. The 16 teams are drawn into four groups of four and each group plays a round-robin tournament. At the end of the group stage, the top two teams advanced to the knockout stage, beginning with the quarter-finals and culminating with the gold medal match at the Azteca Stadium on 26 October 1968. This was the first time an Asian team won a medal, Japan claiming bronze.

Qualification

Venues

Medalists

Squads

Group stage

Group A

Group B

Group C
Ghana replaced Morocco, who refused to play against Israel.

Group D

Knockout stage

Bracket

Quarter-finals

Bulgaria progressed after a drawing of lots.

Semi-finals

Bronze Medal match

Gold Medal match
Bulgaria finished the match with only eight players after having three players sent off.

Statistics

Goalscorers
With seven goals, Kunishige Kamamoto of Japan is the top scorer in the tournament. In total, 116 goals were scored by 68 different players, with two of them credited as own goals.

7 goals
  Kunishige Kamamoto
6 goals
  Antal Dunai
4 goals
  Petar Zhekov
  Ladislav Petráš
  Lajos Szűcs
  Yehoshua Feigenbaum
3 goals
  Atanas Mihaylov
  Charles Tamboueon
  Iván Menczel
  Pulido Rodríguez
  Vicente Pereda
2 goals

  Fernando Ferretti
  Asparuh Nikodimov
  Tsvetan Veselinov
  Pavel Stratil
  Marc-Kanyan Case
  Malik Jabir
  López Oliva
  Nelson Melgar
  Camara Fode Bouya
  Dezső Novák
  Giora Spiegel
  Masashi Watanabe
  Albino Morales
  Kenneth Olayombo
  Toni Grande

1 goal

  Sebastião Carlos da Silva
  Georgi Hristakiev
  Ivan Zafirov
  Ivaylo Georgiev
  Kiril Ivkov
  Mihail Gyonin
  Alfonso Jaramillo
  Fabio Mosquera
  Gustavo Santa
  Tamayo Hoyos
  Jiří Večerek
  Jozef Jarabinský
  Mikuláš Krnáč
  Miloš Herbst
  Juan Ramón Martínez
  Mauricio Alonso Rodríguez
  Daniel Horlaville
  Daniel Perrigaud
  Gérard Hallet
  Gbadamosi Amosa
  Ibrahim Sunday
  Osei Kofi
  Sammy Stevens Sampene
  David Stokes
  Jorge Roldán
  Camara Mamadou Maxim
  Camara Mamadouba Ndongo
  István Juhász
  István Sárközi
  László Fazekas
  Mordechai Spiegler
  Rachamim Talbi
  Shraga Bar
  Cesáreo Victorino
  Luis Estrada
  Peter Anieke
  Samuel Okoye
  Fernando Ortuño
  Juan Fernández Vilela
  Udomsilp Sornbutnark

Own goals
  Humberto Medina (playing against France)
  Segun Olumodeji (playing against Brazil)

Final ranking

References

External links

 Olympic Football Tournament Mexico City 1968, FIFA.com
 RSSSF Summary

 
1968 Summer Olympics events
1968
1968 in association football
1968